Kateh Posht-e Olya (also Romanized as Kateh Posht-e ‘Olyā; also known as Kateh Posht) is a village in Bala Khiyaban-e Litkuh Rural District, in the Central District of Amol County, Mazandaran Province, Iran. At the 2006 census, its population was 585, in 146 families.

References 

Populated places in Amol County